Requienia is an extinct genus of fossil saltwater clam, a marine bivalve molluscs in the order Hippuritida, family Requieniidae. These rudists lived in the Cretaceous period, from the Valanginian age (136.4–140.2) to the Campanian age (70.6–83.5 mya). They were stationary intermediate-level suspension feeders.

Distribution
This genus occurs in the Cretaceous of Albania (collection), Croatia, France, Germany, Hungary, Iraq, Italy, Mexico, Oman, Portugal, Serbia and Montenegro, Spain, Switzerland, Turkey, Ukraine, United States, Venezuela; Jurassic of Hungary.

Species
Requienia ammonia
Requienia migliorinii
Requienia renevieri

References

External links 
 Universal Biological Indexer
 Organism names
 Paleobiology Database
 Sepkoski, Jack Sepkoski's Online Genus Database

Hippuritida
Prehistoric bivalve genera
Valanginian genus first appearances
Campanian genus extinctions
Cretaceous animals of Asia
Fossils of Iraq
Fossils of Oman
Fossils of Turkey
Cretaceous molluscs of Europe
Fossils of Albania
Fossils of Croatia
Fossils of France
Fossils of Germany
Fossils of Hungary
Fossils of Italy 
Fossils of Portugal
Fossils of Spain
Fossils of Switzerland
Fossils of Ukraine
Fossils of Serbia
Cretaceous animals of North America
Fossils of Mexico
Fossils of the United States
Cretaceous animals of South America
Fossils of Venezuela
Fossil taxa described in 2011